Pflug (eng. Plough) is a German-language surname, and may refer to:

 Christiane Pflug (1936–1972), German-born Canadian painter
 Eva Pflug (1929–2008), German actress
 Jo Ann Pflug (born 1940), American actress
 Johann Baptist Pflug (1785–1866), German painter
 Julius von Pflug (1499–1564), German Catholic bishop
 Monika Pflug (born 1954), German speed skater

German-language surnames